Sheean  (Irish: An Sián (Síodhán meaning "a fairy mound")) is a townland in the parish of Islandeady, barony of Burrishoole,  electoral district of Clogher, in County Mayo, Ireland. It has an area of 0.6 square miles (382 acres, 154 hectares) and borders the townlands of (clockwise from the north) Cogaula, Doon, Dooncastle, Derrygorman, Drummindoo, and Carrownaclea. The eponymous settlement is located on a hill.

Sheean is located on the N5 road east of Westport, County Mayo, Ireland. Four parishes meet at Sheean – Aughagower, Islandeady, Kilmeena and Westport. There is also a tumulus in Sheean.

Together with several other townlands Sheean forms an exclave of the parish of Islandeady, separated from the larger part by the territory of the parishes of Aghagower and Kilmaclasser.

References

Townlands of County Mayo